Allen Bowie Davis (1809–1889) was an American businessman.

Davis was born in Montgomery County Maryland to Thomas Davis (1769–1833) and Elizabeth Bowie (1772–1840). His father participated in the Whiskey Rebellion and was the president of the Board of Trustees of the Brookeville Academy, a position that Allen would take later at the age of 24. Davis took over the estate farm Greenwood at 16 and would write educational books on agriculture. By 1850 he would own 27 slaves to maintain four separate farms. In 1840 he would be appointed to the board of public works for Maryland. This in turn led to him becoming the director and trustee of the Chesapeake and Ohio Canal during the final 50 miles of construction. In 1846, Davis imported 1,400 tons of Guano for $100,000 to redistribute to farmers without markup. Davis also returned the Triadelphia Cotton Company to profitability. In 1850 he would represent at the state constitutional convention, helping form the Maryland Agricultural College. He served as president of the Washington-Brookeville Turnpike Company for 16 years and served as county magistrate. His efforts also brought about one of the countries earliest prohibition laws in the State of Maryland.

Davis married Rebecca Comfort Dorsey (1809–1836), daughter of Thomas Beale Dorsey. After her death Davis married again Hester Ann Wilkins (1809–1887). Davis had 5 children: Allen Bowie Davis Jr. (died 1850), Thomas Davis (1840–1849), William Wilkins Davis (1842–1866), Rebecca Dorsey Davis (1843–1921) and Esther Wilkins Davis (1847–1894).

Davis once lived at the Wilson House, part or the Roxbury Mill in Howard County, Maryland, and was proprietor of the family estate Greenwood in Montgomery County built by Ephram Davis in 1755. Davis died in Baltimore at his house on Madison Avenue.

References 

1809 births
1889 deaths
American chief executives
19th-century American businesspeople